Jamshed Mahmood Raza better known as Jami (born; 7 March 1972) is a Pakistani film producer, writer and director.

Filmography

Awards
 TFL (TorinoFilmLab) award at the Locarno International Film Festival (2017)

Lux Style Awards

Jami famously dumped all his LSAs in the street in the wake of Me Too movement, after jury denied to revoke Ali Zafar's nominations at 18th Lux Style Awards. Previously many women had come forward with harassment allegations against Ali.

References

Pakistani film producers
Pakistani film directors
Living people
1972 births
People from Karachi
Lux Style Award winners